Christopher Edward Dennistoun Shaw MBChB, MD, FRACP, FRCP (Hon), FMedSci, FANA (born 1960) is Professor of Neurology and Neurogenetics at the Institute of Psychiatry, Psychology and Neuroscience, King's College London. He is also Head of the Department of Basic and Clinical Neuroscience, Director of the Maurice Wohl Clinical Neuroscience Institute at King's College London and an Honorary Consultant Neurologist and Neurogeneticist at King's College Hospital. His major research interest is in the genetic, molecular and cellular basis of motor neuron diseases such as amyotrophic lateral sclerosis (ALS).

Education 
Shaw conducted his clinical training in general medicine and neurology in New Zealand. In 1992, he began his doctoral studies on Wellcome Trust Fellowship with Professor Alastair Compston at the University of Cambridge.

Career 
Shaw moved to the Institute of Psychiatry (now Institute of Psychiatry, Psychology and Neuroscience) and started collaborating with Professor Nigel Leigh in 1995. Research led by Shaw has identified mutations in two genes causing ALS, namely TARDBP and FUS.

References

1960 births
Living people
Academics of King's College London
Fellows of the Royal Australasian College of Physicians
Fellows of the Royal College of Physicians
Fellows of the Academy of Medical Sciences (United Kingdom)
Fellows of King's College London